Shim is the surname of the following people
 Andrew Shim (born 1983), American-born English actor
 Meleana Shim (born 1991), American soccer midfielder
 Serena Shim (1985–2014), American journalist of Lebanese descent
 Shauna Shim (born 1979), American-born British actress

See also
 Sim (Korean name)